Højdevang Church (Højdevangskirken) is a church in the Amager area of Copenhagen, Denmark.

The church was consecrated on 14 April 1935. It was built on the basis of designs by architect Poul Staffeldt Mathiesen (1891–1979) .
Unlike most churches, Højdevang Church faces south rather than east. This was due to the fact that the church plan was designed in perpendicular to the size of the land, which was longer from north to south rather than from west to east.

References

Other Sources

Lutheran churches in Copenhagen
19th-century Church of Denmark churches
Amager
Churches in the Diocese of Copenhagen